Events from the year 1697 in Ireland.

Incumbent
 Monarch: William III

Events
 October 27 – a thunderstorm ignites the arsenal at Athlone Castle.
 Banishment Act banishes all bishops of the Roman Catholic Church from Ireland.
 Celbridge Abbey in County Kildare is built by Bartholomew Van Homrigh, Lord Mayor of Dublin.
 Famine in the Scottish Borders leads to continued Scottish Presbyterian migration from Scotland to Ulster.

Births
March 8? – Anne Bonny, pirate (d. after 1721 in Jamaica)
September 16 – St George Caulfeild, lawyer and member of the Irish House of Commons (d. 1778)
December 27 – Sollom Emlyn, legal writer (d. 1754)
James Duchal, Presbyterian (d. 1761)
William Ruxton, landowner and member of the Irish House of Commons (d. 1751)
approx. date – John Ryder, Archbishop of Tuam (Church of Ireland) (d. 1775)

Deaths
December 20 – Sir Arthur Gore, 1st Baronet, soldier and politician (b. c.1640)
Francis Burke, Franciscan
William FitzMaurice, 20th Baron Kerry, peer (b. 1633)

References

 
Years of the 17th century in Ireland
1690s in Ireland
Ireland